A Single Life may refer to:

 Single Life (film), a 1921 British silent film
 A Single Life (1985 film), an Australian television film
 A Single Life (2014 film), a Dutch short animated film
 Single Life, a 1985 album by Cameo, or the title song